The Type 41 75 mm cavalry gun was a Japanese field gun first accepted into service in 1908.  The Type 41 designation was given to this gun as it was accepted in the 41st year of Emperor Meiji's reign (1908). It was a slightly lightened version of the Type 38 75 mm field gun that was based on a 1905 Krupp design. It was the primary weapon of artillery units attached to cavalry formations. Although effectively obsolete by the start of World War II, it was used in limited numbers despite nominally being replaced by the Type 95 75 mm field gun.

Design
This Schneider type gun was especially constructed to give artillery support to cavalry regiments. Its design is almost identical with that of the original Model 38 75 mm gun. It is somewhat lighter than the Model 38 improved 75 mm gun, the corresponding direct-support artillery in the infantry division. In 1944, Japanese cavalry brigades had not yet been in combat against U. S. forces, it was not certain whether this old-fashioned gun with unmodified box trails and hydrospring recoil remained in general use or if it had been superseded by a more modern weapon. It can readily be differentiated from the Model 38 75 mm gun by its interrupted thread breechblock.

References

Notes

Bibliography
 Chamberlain, Peter and Gander, Terry. Light and Medium Field Artillery. New York, Arco
 
 War Department Special Series No 25 Japanese Field Artillery October 1944

External links
 Type 41 on Taki's Imperial Japanese Army page

See also
Type 41 75 mm mountain gun

World War I artillery of Japan
4
75 mm artillery